This is a list of episodes for the Teletoon/YTV/Cartoon Network/Canal J/Gulli show Redakai. The first 2 episodes were shown as sneak previews.

Episodes

Season 1: Conquer the Kairu (2011–2012)

Season 2: Lokar's Shadow  (2013) 

Lists of French animated television series episodes
Lists of Canadian children's animated television series episodes